This is a list of seasons completed by the Carolina Cobras. The Cobras were a professional arena football franchise of the Arena Football League (AFL), based in Charlotte, North Carolina. The team was established in 2000. The Cobras made the playoffs twice, but did not appear in an ArenaBowl. In September 2004, the league terminated the franchise after the arrival of the Charlotte Bobcats in the NBA. The team played its home games at RBC Center.

References
General
 

Arena Football League seasons by team
Carolina Cobras
North Carolina sports-related lists